Abu Bakrin Stadium is a football stadium in the city of Magelang, Indonesia. The stadium has a capacity of 10,000 people. It was the home stadium of PPSM Sakti Magelang until 2012.

References

Sports venues in Indonesia
Football venues in Indonesia
Athletics (track and field) venues in Indonesia
Multi-purpose stadiums in Indonesia
Football venues in Central Java
Athletics (track and field) venues in Central Java
Multi-purpose stadiums in Central Java
Sports venues in Magelang
Football venues in Magelang
Buildings and structures in Magelang
Magelang